is a former Japanese footballer.

Career statistics

Club

Notes

References

Living people
1996 births
Japanese footballers
Japanese expatriate footballers
Association football midfielders
Moldovan Super Liga players
II liga players
CSF Bălți players
Skonto FC players
Bruk-Bet Termalica Nieciecza players
Japanese expatriate sportspeople in Moldova
Expatriate footballers in Moldova
Japanese expatriate sportspeople in Latvia
Expatriate footballers in Latvia
Japanese expatriate sportspeople in Poland
Expatriate footballers in Poland